Jalla is a genus of European shield bugs in the subfamily Asopinae erected by Carl Wilhelm Hahn in 1832.  
The type species Jalla dumosa is recorded from northern Europe including the British Isles.

Species 
According to BioLib the following are included:
 Jalla anthracina Jakovlev, 1885
 Jalla dumosa (Linnaeus, 1758)- type species (as Cimex dumosus L.)
 Jalla subcalcarata Jakovlev, 1885
 Jalla subdilatata Reuter, 1900

References

External links
 
 

Pentatomidae genera
Hemiptera of Europe
Asopinae